Arturo Rodríguez may refer to:
Arturo Rodríguez (artist) (born 1956), Cuban-born American painter
Arturo Rodríguez (boxer) (1907–1982), Argentine boxer and rugby union player
Arturo Rodríguez Fernández (1948–2010), Dominican author
Arturo Rodríguez (Spanish footballer) (born 1989), Spanish footballer
Arturo Rodríguez (footballer, born 1990), Mexican footballer
Arturo Rodriguez (footballer, born 1998), Mexican footballer